South Seattle College (SSC, formerly South Seattle Community College) is a public community college in West Seattle, Washington. Founded in 1970, it is one of three colleges which make up the Seattle Colleges District. The Seattle Community Colleges District Board of Trustees voted unanimously in March 2014 to change the name of the District to Seattle Colleges and to change the names of the colleges to Seattle Central College, North Seattle College and South Seattle College. It is home to the South Seattle College Arboretum and incorporates the Georgetown Campus near Boeing Field.

References

External links
Official website

Community colleges in Washington (state)
Universities and colleges in Seattle
Educational institutions established in 1970
Universities and colleges accredited by the Northwest Commission on Colleges and Universities
West Seattle, Seattle